Events from the year 1994 in Romania.

Events 

 5 April – President of Serbia Slobodan Milošević is welcomed on a formal visit to Romania by president Ion Iliescu.
 24 April – The Crans Montana Forum ends after 4 days. Shimon Peres of Israel and Yasser Arafat of the Palestine Liberation Organization take part.
 9-11 May – The president of Albania, Sali Berisha, arrives in Romania.
 21-22 June – President of the Czech Republic, Václav Havel, arrives in Romania.
 22 June – The presidents of Romania and the Czech Republic sign a mutual cooperation and friendship treaty.

See also

References

External links